The census in Azerbaijan is a process of collecting, summarizing, analyzing and publishing the demographic, economic and social data of the population living in the territory of Azerbaijan. The next census in the Republic is expected to be held in 2019.

General 
After the occupation of Azerbaijan Democratic Republic, the socialism began in Northern Azerbaijan on April 28, 1920. In 1926, 1937 and 1939, the percentage of Azerbaijanis among the population was reduced from 62.1% in 1926 to 58.2% in 1937.  The number of Armenians has increased, and the percentage of it remained the same in the total population. The number of Russians decreased from 9.5% in 1926, to 15.7% in 1937 and reached to 16.5% in 1939.

1926 
December 17, 1926, the first census of the population was carried out in the USSR. The population of the Azerbaijani SSR was also included in this census. During the 1926 census, the territory of the Azerbaijan SSR was 85,968 km2, the actual population was 2,314,571 (1,212,859 men, 1101712 women). 649,557 actual population (338325 men, 311232 women) lived in the cities, 1,665,014 (874534 men, 790,480 women) lived in the villages. During the census, there were 35 cities and 5788 rural settlements in the territory of the Azerbaijan SSR.

1937 
The last census of the Azerbaijan nation was conducted in USSR with Turkish name on January 6, 1937. According to this census, the total number of ethnic Azerbaijanis living in the USSR was 2,134,648.

1939 
The final results of the 1937 census were canceled, and the new census was held in 1939. Only 62 large nations were counted in the population census of 1939. During the census, the number of Azerbaijanis in the Soviet Socialist Republic was 1870,471.

1959 
According to the Census of 1959, the number of Azerbaijanis was 2 494 381 which was 67.46% of the total population in Azerbaijan SRR.

1970 
According to the Census of 1970, the number of Azerbaijanis was 3 776 778 which was 73,81% of the total population in Azerbaijan SRR.

1989

1999 
According to the Census held on January 27 - February 3, 1999, the total population was 7,953,383. 3,883,355 of them were men, 4,070,283 were women. 90.59% of the population is Azerbaijanis.

2009 
On April 13–22, 2009, the second census of the population in the Republic of Azerbaijan was held within 10 days. During the 2009 census, 35 questions were included in the questionnaire, 29 of which were related to the citizen and 6 of them were related to housing conditions. The census process was carried out by 24,483 people.

According to 2009 census, the total population of Azerbaijan was 8,922,447, of which 8,172,809 were Azerbaijanis.

See also 
Demographics of Azerbaijan

References 

Demographics of Azerbaijan
Azerbaijan